The following articles contain lists of characters from The Office television franchise:

 List of The Office (American TV series) characters
 List of The Office (British TV series) characters